David Garrick is a 1913 British black-and-white silent film based on the life of British actor David Garrick. The film starred Seymour Hicks and Ellaline Terriss and was based on the 1864 play David Garrick by T. W. Robertson, adapted by Max Pemberton. The film was directed by Leedham Bantock. Made by Hepworth Pictures at Walton Studios, it was three reels long.

Plot summary
The film is set in London in the 1740s where Ada Ingot (Ellaline Terriss), a young woman, is infatuated with the actor David Garrick (Seymour Hicks). Her love for Garrick is so strong that she refuses to accept a marriage arranged by her father, Mr. Ingot (William Lugg). Ingot meets with Garrick and initially tries to persuade him to leave the country or give up acting, but when Garrick learns the reason, he assures Ingot that he will be able to cure Ada of her attraction and asks Ingot to arrange a meeting. Garrick is sympathetic to Ada's plight because he himself has fallen in love with a girl he doesn't know, but he promises her father that he will not make any romantic moves towards Ada.

Cast 
David Garrick - Seymour Hicks
Mr. Simon Ingot - William Lugg
Mr. Alexander Smith - J. C. Buckstone
Mr. Brown - Henry Kitts
Mr. Jones - Lawrence Caird
Ada Ingot - Ellaline Terriss
Lord Fareleigh - Vincent Sternroyd
Miss Araminta Brown - Nellie Dade

References

External links
David Garrick (1913) on the Internet Movie Database
David Garrick (1913) on Hollywood Premiere
David Garrick (1913) on the Complete Index to World Film

1913 films
1910s historical comedy-drama films
British historical comedy-drama films
British black-and-white films
British silent short films
Films set in London
Films set in the 18th century
Hepworth Pictures films
1910s British films